The Mozambique national under-20 football team represents Mozambique in men's U-20 football team and is controlled by the Mozambican Football Federation (MFF), the governing body for football in Mozambique. In 2021 the team has qualified for the first time 2021 Africa U-20 Cup of Nations.

History

Players
The following squad called up for 2021 Africa U-20 Cup of Nations.

Recent fixtures & results

2021

Competitive records

FIFA U-20 World Cup

Africa U-20 Cup of Nations

*Draws include knockout matches decided by penalty shootout.

COSAFA U-20 Cup

*Draws include knockout matches decided by penalty shootout.

References

External links

African national under-20 association football teams
under-20